Judith Hann (born 8 September 1942 at Littleover, Derby, England) is a broadcaster and writer specialising in science, food and the environment.

Education 
Hann attended the University of Durham, where she edited Palatinate, the university newspaper, for two terms in 1963.

Life and career 
Hann presented BBC's Tomorrow's World between 1974 and 1994. She has since made television guest appearances, and also some TV commercials. In 1997, she appeared in a Shredded Wheat advertisement, in which she used her scientific judgement to inform viewers that the product could possibly help keep their hearts healthy. In 2006, she presented Two's A Crowd, a series on BBC Radio 4 that searched for the secrets of human identity. She runs her own media training and presentation skills company.

Personal life 
Hann lives on a farm near the small town of Lechlade, in the Cotswolds. She was married to John Exelby, a former executive at BBC News, who died in 2019; they had two sons. She is passionate about herbs and has a very herb large garden, from which she offers courses and has published a book about. She is the daughter of former Derby County footballer and trainer Ralph Hann.

Television appearances 
 Tomorrow's World (BBC1) presenter (1974–1994) (she was the show's longest-serving presenter)
 The Risk Business (BBC1) - presenter (1980)
 Not with a Bang (ITV) as herself (1990)
 Shooting Stars with Vic Reeves and Bob Mortimer (BBC2) - Episode #3.7 (1997) as herself.
 Tomorrow's World Live (BBC4) - one-off special (2018) co-presenter

Books 
 How Science Works  (1991).
 The Food of Love  (1987).
 Judith Hann's Total Health Plan  (1984).
 But What About the Children? A Working Parents' Guide to Child Care  (1976).
 The Family Scientist  (1979).
 The Perfect Baby?  (1982).
 Herbs  (2017).

References

External links 
 Judith Hann website
 
 Royal Society
 Agency details

1942 births
Living people
Alumni of St Aidan's College, Durham
English television presenters
People from Littleover
People from Lechlade